Supíkovice is a municipality and village in Jeseník District in the Olomouc Region of the Czech Republic. It has about 700 inhabitants.

Etymology
The name is probably derived from the personal Slavic name Šupík, while the German name is thought to have been created by transcription. The Czech name has been used again since 1924.

History
The first written mention of Supíkovice is from 1284, when it was part of fragmented Piast-ruled Poland. It soon became part of the Duchy of Nysa, which later on passed under Bohemian suzerainty, and following the duchy's dissolution in 1850, it was incorporated directly into Bohemia.

The municipality was in the past known for limestone quarries and lime production. In the second half of the 19th century, the municipality became known for mining and processing of granite and marble.

Following World War I, from 1918, the municipality formed part of Czechoslovakia and from 1938 to 1945 it was occupied by Germany. During World War II, the Germans operated the E166 and E577 forced labour subcamps of the Stalag VIII-B/344 prisoner-of-war camp for Allied POWs in the village.

Notable people
Petr Ševčík (born 1994), footballer; grew up here

References

External links

Villages in Jeseník District
Czech Silesia